The 1897 South Dakota State Jackrabbits football team was an American football team that represented South Dakota State University as an independent during the 1897 college football season. In their first season since 1889, they played in one game, a 0–22 loss against Sioux Falls.

Schedule

References

South Dakota State
South Dakota State Jackrabbits football seasons
College football winless seasons